Çukuryurt is a village in the Tercan District, Erzincan Province, Turkey. The village had a population of 23 in 2021.

References 

Villages in Tercan District
Kurdish settlements in Erzincan Province